Sigurd Thinn (born September 23, 1957) is a former Norwegian ice hockey player. He was born in Oslo, Norway and played for the club Vålerengens IF. He played for the Norwegian national ice hockey team at the 1988 Winter Olympics.

Thinn has also played for Furuset and Bergen.

References

External links

1957 births
Living people
Ice hockey players at the 1988 Winter Olympics
Norwegian ice hockey players
Olympic ice hockey players of Norway
Ice hockey people from Oslo